Vacuum Flowers is a science fiction novel by American writer Michael Swanwick, published in 1987.  It is an early example of the cyberpunk genre, and features one of the earliest uses of the concept of wetware.

Plot summary
The protagonist of the novel is Rebel Elizabeth Mudlark, the recorded personality of a dead woman which has become the property of a corporation that intends to sell it as entertainment. Rebel escapes by taking over the body of Eucrasia Walsh, a woman who rents herself out for temporary testing of new wetware programming. While escaping the corporation Eucrasia's latent personality is beginning to reassert itself.

Rebel's adventures take her throughout the widely colonised Solar System.  She initially lives in canister worlds orbiting the Sun in a trojan orbit, where she sometimes works removing bioengineered weeds (vacuum flowers, the space-tolerant flora of the title) from the canisters' exterior ports.  Since the recording omits most of her memories, she must rely on strangers to help her survive, though she cannot trust any of them. Rebel meets and falls in love with Wyeth, a leader whose personality was reprogrammed into a team of four complementary personas.  Together they form an uneasy alliance with The Comprise, the hive mind which rules Earth, and encounter Dysonworlders, who live on genetically engineered artificial comets (Dyson trees).

Sources

External links
 

1987 American novels
Novels by Michael Swanwick
1987 science fiction novels
American science fiction novels
Cyberpunk novels
Hive minds in fiction
Novels about genetic engineering
Biopunk novels